Harry Potter is a series of novels written by J. K. Rowling.

Harry Potter may also refer to other parts of the franchise:

 Harry Potter (character), the main character in Harry Potter media
 Harry Potter (film series), the David Heyman-produced film series based on the Rowling novels
 Harry Potter and the Philosopher's Stone (film)
 Harry Potter and the Chamber of Secrets (film)
 Harry Potter and the Prisoner of Azkaban (film)
 Harry Potter and the Goblet of Fire (film)
 Harry Potter and the Order of the Phoenix (film)
 Harry Potter and the Half-Blood Prince (film)
 Harry Potter and the Deathly Hallows – Part 1
 Harry Potter and the Deathly Hallows – Part 2
 Wizarding World, the media franchise based on the Harry Potter books
 Fictional universe of Harry Potter, the shared fictional universe in which the Harry Potter novels, films and other media are set
 Harry Potter and the Cursed Child, a 2016 theatrical play following up on the character

Others
 Harry Potter (journalist) (1941–2014), Australian television journalist and crime reporter
 Harry Potter (rugby union) (born 1997), English-born Australian rugby union player
 Harry Potter Jr. and Harry Potter Sr., the name of two characters in the 1986 film Troll

See also
 List of Harry Potter-related topics

Potter, Harry